The Sistema Michoacano de Radio y Televisión (Michoacán State Radio and Television System or SMRTV) is the public broadcaster of the Mexican state of Michoacán. It includes statewide FM and TV networks, as well as an AM radio station in the state capital of Morelia. SMRTV's programming primarily consists of scientific, cultural and educational content, along with news and sports coverage.

Television

Programming
SMRTV's television network includes its own productions as well as programs from other public broadcasters, such as Canal Once's Once Noticias. Canal 22 and Deutsche Welle are also among SMRTV's major program suppliers.

SMRTV also produces two daily editions of "SM Noticias", which are carried on AM, FM and TV.

Transmitters
SMRTV uses a network of terrestrial television transmitters to provide statewide coverage.

|-

|-

|-

|-

|-

|-

|-

|-

|-

|-

|-

|-

While all stations hold authorizations for digital television, none were on the air as of late 2015; several stations reduced power in order to qualify for an extension of one year to build digital facilities. SMRTV digital transmitters use virtual channel 16.

The Huetamo transmitter was authorized in January 2017.

In March 2018, in order to facilitate the repacking of TV services out of the 600 MHz band (channels 38-51), XHPMG (22) and XHMOR (14) were assigned new channels for continued digital operations.

FM radio
The state FM network is headed by XHREL-FM 106.9 in Morelia. Its program schedule is largely musical, with the exception of SMRTV news programs and one program from MVS Radio.

Transmitters
12 transmitters offer statewide FM service.

AM radio
XEREL-AM 1550 in Morelia broadcasts an alternate program schedule to FM, with agricultural news, programs directed at the Morelia area and some music. The station operates with one kilowatt of power.

References

External links

Public television in Mexico
Public radio in Mexico
Mass media in Morelia
Radio stations in Michoacán
Spanish-language radio stations
Television stations in Michoacán